Kevin Whitted is a retired American basketball player and coach. He played in Europe after a successful career at University of Tenneseee. He attended the same High School as Michael Jordan at Wilmington Laney High School. The school retired his Jersey and can be found right beside Michael's jersey in the schools Gymnasium.

Coaching career 
During the 2007-08 Premier Basketball League season Whitted coached the Wilmington Sea Dawgs.  They played in the East Division.  They finished the regular season at 11-9 and tied for second in the division with the Reading Railers behind the Rochester Razorsharks.  They made the playoffs and faced the Maryland Nighthawks in the first round but lost.  On April 22, 2008, Kevin Whitted resigned as head coach of the Sea Dawgs   On October 17, Dale Kuhl was named head coach.

NBA D League

On July 29, 2009 Whitted was named an assistant coach for the Springfield Armor.

On October 22, 2012 Whitted was named interim coach for Southwest Tennessee Community College.

On October 13, 2014 Kevin Whitted was named as the first coach of the Westchester Knicks.  On March 30, 2015, the Knicks announced via Twitter that head coach Kevin Whitted was relieved of his duties and that assistant coach Craig Hodges would serve as the interim head coach for the final week of the 2014-15 season.

References

1957 births
Living people
American men's basketball coaches
American men's basketball players
Basketball coaches from North Carolina
Basketball players from North Carolina
Fort Wayne Mad Ants coaches
Forwards (basketball)
Sportspeople from Wilmington, North Carolina
Springfield Armor coaches
Tennessee Volunteers basketball players
Westchester Knicks coaches